Roman Khalitov is a Russian competition shooter who took gold at the 2017 IPSC Rifle World Shoot in the Manual Open division and silver at the 2015 IPSC Shotgun World Shoot in the Open division. At the 2018 IPSC Shotgun World Shoot he placed fifth in the Open division with a 94.19 % score. He also has four podium finishes from the IPSC Russian Shotgun Championship (2015, 2016, 2017 and 2018), and one silver medal from the IPSC Russian Handgun Championship (2015).

See also 
 Josh Froelich, American sport shooter
 Kim Leppänen, Finnish sport shooter

References

External links 
 Interview with Roman Khalitov and Alena Karelina after the 2017 IPSC Rifle World Shoot (YouTube)

Year of birth missing (living people)
Living people
IPSC shooters
Russian male sport shooters
Place of birth missing (living people)